John Preston may refer to:

Politicians
John Preston (died 1434), Member of Parliament (MP) for Sussex
John Preston (c. 1578 – c. 1642), MP for Lancaster
John B. Preston, first Surveyor General of the Oregon Territory
John Preston, 1st Baron Tara (1764–1821), Irish politician
John Preston (alderman) (1611–1686), mayor of Dublin in 1654

Fiction
John Preston, a fictional character in the 2002 feature film Equilibrium
John James Preston, a fictional character in the American TV series Sex and the City
Alias John Preston, a 1955 British horror film

Military
John S. Preston (1809–1881), American Civil War general
John Preston (Medal of Honor) (1841–1885), American Civil War sailor and Medal of Honor recipient
John F. Preston, United States Army officer, Inspector General
John Thomas Lewis Preston, American educator and military officer from Virginia

Others
John Preston (rebel) (died 1381), participant in Peasants' Revolt
John Preston (priest) (1587–1628), English clergyman
John Preston, Lord Fentonbarns (died 1616), Scottish judge 
John Preston (settler) (1699–1747), Irish immigrant to America, founder of the Preston dynasty
John Preston (luthier), 18th-century English guitar and cittern maker
John W. Preston (1877–1958), American judge
Jack Preston (John Preston), English rugby league player of the 1900s
Johnny Preston (1939–2011), American pop music singer
John Preston (American author) (1945–1994), American author of gay erotica
John Preston (music executive) (1950–2017), British music industry executive
John Preston (English author), English journalist and novelist
John G. Preston (born 1960s), American film and stage actor
John Preston (dog handler) (?–2008), law enforcement officer whose dog was involved in controversial criminal cases in Florida
John T. Preston, venture capitalist and entrepreneur

See also